The following Confederate Army units and commanders fought in the Battle of Fort Donelson of the American Civil War. Order of battle compiled from the army organization, and the reports. The Union order of battle is listed separately.

Abbreviations used

Military Rank
 BG = Brigadier General
 Col = Colonel
 Ltc = Lieutenant Colonel
 Maj = Major
 Cpt = Captain

Army of Central Kentucky

General Albert Sidney Johnston Not present at battle

Fort Donelson
BG Bushrod Johnson Feb 9
BG Gideon J. Pillow Feb 9-13
BG John B. Floyd Feb 13-16
BG Gideon J. Pillow Feb 16
BG Simon B. Buckner, Sr. Feb 16
     
{| class="wikitable"
! width=25% | Division
! width=25% | Brigade
! Regiments and Others
|-
| rowspan=2 |
Right Wing

    
BG Simon B. Buckner, Sr. 
| 2nd Brigade
  
(attached to 3rd Brigade)
|
 2nd Kentucky: Col Roger Hanson
 14th Mississippi: Maj Washington Doss
 41st Tennessee: Col Robert Farquharson
|-
| 3rd Brigade
  
Col John C. Brown
|
 3rd Tennessee: Ltc Thomas Gordon (w), Maj N. F. Cheairs
 18th Tennessee: Col Joseph B. Palmer
 32nd Tennessee: Col Edmond Cook
|-
| rowspan=7 |
Left Wing

    
BG Gideon Johnson Pillow    
BG Bushrod Johnson
| 1st Brigade
  
Col Adolphus Heiman
|
 27th Alabama: Col Adolphus Hughes
 10th Tennessee: Ltc Randal W. McGavock
 42nd Tennessee: Col William A. Quarles
 48th Tennessee: Col William Voorhies
 53rd Tennessee: Col Alfred Abernathy, Ltc Thomas F. Winston
|-
| 2nd Brigade
  
Col Thomas J. Davidson  
Col John M. Simonton  
Col John Gregg
|
 8th Kentucky: Ltc Hylan B. Lyon
 1st Mississippi: Col John M. Simonton, Ltc A. S. Hamilton
 23rd Mississippi: Ltc Joseph Wells
 7th Texas: Col John Gregg
|-
| 3rd Brigade
  
Col Joseph Drake
|
 3rd Alabama Battalion: Maj John Garvin
 15th Arkansas: Col James M. Gee
 4th Mississippi: Maj Thomas Adaire
|-
| 4th Brigade(Fort Donelson Garrison)
  
Col John W. Head
|
 30th Tennessee: Col John W. Head
 49th Tennessee: Col James Bailey
 50th Tennessee: Col Cyrus Sugg
 1st Tennessee Battalion: Maj Steven Colms
 Stankiewicz's Tennessee Battery: Lt Peter Stankiewicz
|-
| 5th Brigade
  
Col Gabriel C. Wharton
|
 51st Virginia Infantry: Ltc: James Massie
 56th Virginia Infantry: Col Phillip Slaughter
|-
| 6th Brigade
  
Col John McCausland
|
 20th Mississippi: Maj William Brown
 36th Virginia Infantry: Ltc Leigh Reid
 50th Virginia Infantry: Maj Charles Thorburn
|-
| 7th Brigade
  
Col William E. Baldwin
|
 26th Mississippi: Col Arthur Reynolds
 26th Tennessee: Col John Lillard
|-
| rowspan=2 |
Attached Units
| Cavalry Brigade
  
Lt Col Nathan B. Forrest
|
 3rd Tennessee Cavalry Ltc Nathan Bedford Forrest
 9th Tennessee Cavalry Ltc George Gantt
 1st Kentucky Cavalry, Company D: Cpt S.B. Williams
 1st Kentucky Cavalry, Company G: Cpt M.D. Willcox
 1st Kentucky Cavalry, Company K: Cpt James Huey
 Melton's Kentucky Cavalry Company : Cpt James Melton
|-
| Artillery
  
Lt Col Milton Haynes
|
 French's Mercer (VA) Battery: Cpt Napoleon B. French
 Gauley (VA) Artillery: Cpt Stephen Adams
 Goochland (VA) Battery: Cpt John Guy
 Kanawha (VA) Artillery: Cpt Thomas E. Jackson
 Graves' Kentucky Battery: Cpt Rice E. Graves
 Green's Kentucky Battery: Cpt Henry Green
 Maney's Tennessee Battery: Cpt Frank Maney (w)
 Porter's Tennessee Battery: Cpt Thomas Porter (w), Lt John W. Morton
 Ross' Tennessee Battery: Cpt Ruben Ross
 Culbertson's Tennessee Battery: Cpt Jacob Culbertson
 51st Tennessee: Col. B.M. Browder

See also

 Tennessee in the American Civil War

Notes

References
Cooling, Benjamin Franklin, The Campaign for Fort Donelson, U.S. National Park Service and Eastern National, 1999, .
Gott, Kendall D., Where the South Lost the War: An Analysis of the Fort Henry—Fort Donelson Campaign, February 1862, Stackpole books, 2003, .
 Knight, James R., The Battle Of Fort Donelson: No Terms but Unconditional Surrender, The History Press, 2011ISBN 978-160949129-1.
 Robert Underwood Johnson, Clarence Clough Buell, Battles and Leaders of the Civil War: The Opening Battles, Volume 1 (Pdf), New York: The Century Co., 1887.
U.S. War Department, The War of the Rebellion: a Compilation of the Official Records of the Union and Confederate Armies, U.S. Government Printing Office, 1880–1901.

American Civil War orders of battle